Maranzana is a comune (municipality) in the Province of Asti in the Italian region Piedmont, located about  southeast of Turin and about  southeast of Asti.

Maranzana borders the following municipalities: Alice Bel Colle, Cassine, Mombaruzzo, and Ricaldone.

Maranzana is the birthplace of the explorer Giacomo Bove.

Demographic evolution

References

External links
 www.comune.maranzana.at.it

Cities and towns in Piedmont